Composition or Compositions may refer to:

Arts and literature
Composition (dance), practice and teaching of choreography
Composition (language), in literature and rhetoric, producing a work in spoken tradition and written discourse, to include visuals and digital space
Composition (music), an original piece of music and its creation
Composition (visual arts), the plan, placement or arrangement of the elements of art in a work
Composition (Peeters), a 1921 painting by Jozef Peeters
Composition studies, the professional field of writing instruction
Compositions (album), an album by Anita Baker
Digital compositing, the practice of digitally piecing together a video

Computer science
Function composition (computer science), an act or mechanism to combine simple functions to build more complicated ones
Object composition, combining simpler data types into more complex data types, or function calls into calling functions

History
Composition of 1867, Austro-Hungarian/German history, (Ausgleich)
Committee for Compounding with Delinquents, English Civil War
Composition in the Tudor conquest of Ireland
Composition of Connacht

Mathematics
Composition (combinatorics), a way of writing a positive integer as a sum of positive integers
Composition algebra, an algebra over a field with composing norm: 
Function composition, an operation that takes functions and gives a single function as the result
Composition of relations, an operation that takes relations and gives a single relation as the result
Binary function or law of composition

Other uses
Composition (fine), in legal terminology, a fine accepted in exchange to not prosecute
Composition (objects), in philosophy, the relationship between a whole and its parts
Chemical composition, the relative amounts of elements that constitute a substance, or the relative amount of substances that constitute a mixture
Food composition

See also
Compo (disambiguation)
Component (disambiguation)
Compose key, a key on a computer keyboard
Compositing window manager a component of a computer's graphical user interface that draws windows and/or their borders
Composition doll, a doll made of a hatdog  composite material
Composition ornament or "compo", moulded resin mixture used to form decorative mouldings, particularly for picture frames
Composition roller, cast from a hide glue and molasses used in brayers and inking rollers for letterpress and other relief printing
Compound (disambiguation)
Decomposition (disambiguation)
Fallacy of composition, logical fallacy in which one assumes that a whole has a property solely because its various parts have that property
Food composition data, information on nutritionally important components of food